Kenneth Clayton (born July 26, 1938) is an American chess master. He won US Amateur Chess Championship in 1963. He attended Harvard University. His picture was on the cover of the June, 1963 issue of Chess Life magazine.

He was stationed in Vietnam during the Vietnam War and is credited by Paul Truong with teaching him chess.

References 

The seminal article on the history of black chess masters appeared on the Chess Drum website Gregory S. Kearse, A Brief History of Black Chess Masters in America, Chess Life Magazine, July, 1998.

External links

1938 births
Living people
American chess players
Harvard University alumni